Charles Samuel Henry (March 24, 1900 – May 25, 1972) was an American Negro league pitcher in the 1920s.

A native of Knoxville, Tennessee, Henry made his Negro leagues debut in 1922 with the Hilldale Club. He went on to play three seasons with the Harrisburg Giants before returning to Hilldale in 1926, and finishing his career with the Detroit Stars in 1929. Henry died in Louisville, Kentucky in 1972 at age 72.

References

External links
 and Baseball-Reference Black Baseball stats and Seamheads

1900 births
1972 deaths
Detroit Stars players
Harrisburg Giants players
Hilldale Club players
20th-century African-American sportspeople
Baseball pitchers